Work in Fishing Convention (2007) C 188, was adopted at the 96th International Labour Conference (ILC) of the International Labour Organization ILO in 2007. The objectives of the Convention is to ensure that fishers have decent conditions of work on board fishing vessels with regard to minimum requirements for work on board; conditions of service; accommodation and food; occupational safety and health protection; medical care and social security. It applies to all fishers and fishing vessels engaged in commercial fishing operations. It supersedes the old Conventions relating to fishermen.

Subject area covered 
The following subject areas, among others, are addressed: the responsibilities of fishing vessel owners and skippers for the safety of the fishers on board and the safety of the vessels; minimum age for work on board fishing vessels and for assignment to certain types of activities; medical examination and certification required for work on fishing vessels, with the possibility of exceptions for smaller vessels or those at sea for short periods; manning and hours of rest; crew lists; fishers’ work agreements; repatriation; recruitment and placement of fishers, and use of private employment agencies; payment of fishers; on board accommodation and food; medical care at sea; occupational safety and health; social security; and protection in the case of work-related sickness, injury or death (through a system for fishing vessel owners’ liability or compulsory insurance, workers’ compensation or other schemes).

Responsibility 
Article 8 of the convention provided the liability of owners of fishing vessels. The owner of the fishing vessel had the full responsibility for the master is possessing the resources and equipment necessary to fulfil the obligations of the convention.

Recommendation 
Work in Fishing Recommendation 2007 (No. 199) provides additional guidance on the matters covered by the Convention.

Ratifications and force
The convention could come into force 12 months after it had been ratified by 10 states, eight of which had to be coastal countries. Following Lithuania's ratification of the convention on 16 November 2016, the convention had come into force on 17 November 2017.
As of February 2023, the convention has been ratified by 20 states:

References

External links 
Text.
Ratifications.
ILO, Work in Fishing Convention. Work in Fishing Convention Summary
ICSF Guidebook: Understanding the Work in Fishing Convention, 2007

International Labour Organization conventions
Treaties concluded in 2007
Treaties entered into force in 2017
Admiralty law treaties
Fisheries treaties
Treaties of Angola
Treaties of Argentina
Treaties of Bosnia and Herzegovina
Treaties of the Republic of the Congo
Treaties of Estonia
Treaties of France
Treaties of Morocco
Treaties of Norway
Treaties of South Africa
2007 in labor relations